Homestead is a town in Florence County, Wisconsin, United States. The population was 383 at the 2020 census.

Geography
According to the United States Census Bureau, the town has a total area of 54.3 square miles (140.7 km2), of which, 53.9 square miles (139.5 km2) of it is land and 0.5 square miles (1.2 km2) of it (0.87%) is water.

Demographics
As of the census of 2000, there were 378 people, 158 households, and 109 families residing in the town.  The population density was 7.0 people per square mile (2.7/km2).  There were 351 housing units at an average density of 6.5 per square mile (2.5/km2).  The racial makeup of the town was 98.68% White, 0.26% Native American, 0.26% Asian, 0.26% Pacific Islander, and 0.53% from two or more races.

There were 158 households, out of which 30.4% had children under the age of 18 living with them, 62.7% were married couples living together, 3.8% had a female householder with no husband present, and 30.4% were non-families. 26.6% of all households were made up of individuals, and 9.5% had someone living alone who was 65 years of age or older.  The average household size was 2.39 and the average family size was 2.92.

In the town, the population was spread out, with 22.8% under the age of 18, 5.6% from 18 to 24, 27.5% from 25 to 44, 30.7% from 45 to 64, and 13.5% who were 65 years of age or older.  The median age was 42 years. For every 100 females, there were 103.2 males.  For every 100 females age 18 and over, there were 111.6 males.

The median income for a household in the town was $31,944, and the median income for a family was $40,000. Males had a median income of $31,250 versus $22,857 for females. The per capita income for the town was $21,491.  About 1.8% of families and 4.2% of the population were below the poverty line, including 4.7% of those under age 18 and 4.4% of those age 65 or over.

References

Towns in Florence County, Wisconsin
Iron Mountain micropolitan area
Towns in Wisconsin